Al-Iraq Sport Club, is an Iraqi football team based in Karbala, that plays in the Iraq Division Three.

History
Al-Iraq SC was founded in 2003 in Karbala under the name Al-Taff SC until 2008, when the name of the club was changed to Al-Iraq SC.

Managerial history
  Maitham Dael-Haq
 Fadhel Abdul-Hussein

See also 
 2016–17 Iraq FA Cup
 2021–22 Iraq FA Cup

References

External links
 Al-Iraq SC on Goalzz.com
 Iraq Clubs- Foundation Dates

2003 establishments in Iraq
Association football clubs established in 2003
Football clubs in Karbala